Kiyotaki Dam is an earthfill dam located in Shimane Prefecture in Japan. The dam is used for flood control. The catchment area of the dam is 6.9 km2. The dam impounds about 9  ha of land when full and can store 835 thousand cubic meters of water. The construction of the dam was started on 1971 and completed in 1984.

References

Dams in Shimane Prefecture
1984 establishments in Japan